Lester Goran (May 16, 1928 – February 6, 2014) was an American writer best known for his works about growing up poor the Oakland neighborhood of Pittsburgh, Pennsylvania.

Early life
Goran was born May 16, 1928 in Pittsburgh, Pennsylvania. His parents were Jacob and Tillie Goran. Goran was raised in a housing project near the University of Pittsburgh. Although the university was close, Goran grew up among the working class culture of the projects. Although he was Jewish, his writing was heavily influenced by the culture of Irish-Americans and the goings on of the local pubs, especially the Irish Club.

Education
Goran attended Fifth Avenue High School and Schenley High School and the University of Pittsburgh for both his B.A. and M.A. which he earned in 1951 and 1961, respectively. Goran also served with the U.S. Army Corps of Engineers and the Military Police. Goran married Edythe McDowell. The couple had three children.

Career
Goran joined the faculty at the University of Miami in Coral Gables, Florida in 1960. He became a professor of English in 1974. He founded the Creative Writing Program in the College of Arts and Sciences in 1965. In 1991, he contributed to establishing the University of Miami's Master of Fine Arts program. Over the course of his career as a faculty member at the University of Miami, he taught more than 20,000 students.

Goran's work reflects a great deal about his past and upbringing. In Tales from the Irish Club: A Collection of Short Stories, Goran portrays the neighborhood of his childhood by presenting it through a series of short stories. Much of his work is influenced by Irish-American culture.

The sequel to Tales from the Irish Club was She Loved Me Once, another collection of short stories. Critics welcomed She Loved Me Once as a simple and solid portrayal of Goran's boyhood community.

In his novel, Bing Crosby's Last Song, Goran explores Pittsburgh through the eyes of his main character Daly Racklin. The novel takes place just before the assassination of John F. Kennedy and chronicles Daly's confrontation with heart problems and the prospect of losing his home. Critics, including Library Journal reviewer Susan Gene Clifford, said work was more of a "nostalgic snapshot" as opposed to a true novel. But it was praised  by most critics for its down-to-earth style.

Selected bibliography
 The Paratrooper of Mechanic Avenue (1960)
 Maria Light (1962)
 The Candy Butcher's Farewell (1964)
 The Stranger in the Snow (1966)
 The Demon in the Sun Parlor (1968)
 The Keeper of Secrets (1971)
 Mrs. Beautiful (1985)
 The Bright Streets of Surfside: The Memoir of a Friendship with Isaac Bashevis Singer (1994)
 Tales from the Irish Club: A Collection of Short Stories (1996)
 She Loved Me Once, and Other Stories (1997)
 Bing Crosby's Last Song (1998)
 Outlaws of the Purple Cow and Other Stories (1999)
 'Don't I Know You?', an extract from the as-yet-unpublished novel Unnatural Expectations, in Contrappasso Magazine (Issue 1, 2012)

References

Bibliography
 Dictionary of Literary Biography, Volume 244: American Short-Story Writers since World War II, Thomson Gale (Detroit, MI), 2001.
 Contemporary Authors Online, Gale, 2008. Reproduced in Biography Resource Center. Farmington Hills, Mich.: Gale, 2008.

External links
 The Magic Streets of Pittsburgh: An Interview with Lester Goran by Matthew Asprey in Contrappasso magazine] (Issue 1, 2012)
 Lester Goran at the Biography Resource Center
 Review of Tales From the Irish Club at The New York Times
 Information on Lester Goran at the National Writers' Workshop
 List of works by Lester Goran at Open Library
 Matthew Asprey Gear's 2010 essay ‘From Sobaski’s Stairway to the Irish Club: Lester Goran’s Pittsburgh‘

2014 deaths
1928 births
20th-century American novelists
21st-century American novelists
American male novelists
United States Army soldiers
University of Miami faculty
University of Pittsburgh alumni
Novelists from Florida
Writers from Pittsburgh
20th-century American male writers
21st-century American male writers
Novelists from Pennsylvania